Gogui may refer to: 
Gogui, Mali
Gogui, Mauritania